David McLaren may refer to:

 David McLaren (colonial manager) (1785–1850), colonial manager (CEO) of the colony of South Australia (1837–1841)
 David McLaren (politician) (1872–1939), mayor of Wellington and member of the New Zealand Parliament

See also
 David MacLaren (disambiguation)